Barbara Kralj (born 5 January 1994) is a Slovenian midfielder.

External links 
 

1994 births
Living people
Slovenian women's footballers
Women's association football midfielders
Slovenia women's international footballers
ŽNK Olimpija Ljubljana players